This is a list of plant genera that engage in myco-heterotrophic relationships with fungi. It does not include the fungi that are parasitized by these plants.

Monocotyledons

Burmanniaceae (Dioscoreales)

 Afrothismia - 3 species
 Apteria - 1 species
 Burmannia - 60 species
 Campylosiphon - 1 species
 Dictyostega - 1 species
 Gymnosiphon - 50 species
 Hexapterella - 2 species
 Thismia - 28 species

Corsiaceae (Liliales)

 Arachnitis - 1 species
 Corsia - 20 species
 Corsiopsis - 1 species

Iridaceae, formerly Geosiridaceae (Asparagales)

 Geosiris - 1 species

Orchidaceae (Asparagales)

This list concerns only the species that are leafless or are losing photosynthetic function.

 Aphyllorchis - 15 species
 Corallorhiza - 15 species
 Cymbidium - 1 species
 Cyrtosia - 5 species
 Cystorchis - 8 species
 Cephalanthera - 1 species
 Didymoplexis - 10 species 
 Epipogium - 3 species
 Eulophia - 1 species
 Galeola - 10 species
 Gastrodia - 35 species
 Hexalectris - 7 species
 Lecanorchis - 20 species
 Limodorum - 1 species
 Neottia - 9 species
 Pterostylis - (as yet unresolved number)
 Rhizanthella -  2 species
 Stereosandra - 1 species
 Stigmatodactylus - 4 species
 Wullschlaegelia - 2 species
 Yoania -  2 species

Petrosaviaceae, also called Melanthiaceae (Petrosaviales)

 Petrosavia - 2-4 species

Triuridaceae (Pandanales), including Lacandoniaceae

 Lacandonia -  1 species
 Sciaphila - 31 species
 Triuris - 3 species

Eudicots

Ericaceae (Ericales)
Pyroleae (partially myco-heterotrophic apart from Pyrola picta subsp. aphylla)
 Chimaphila - 4-5 species
 Moneses - 1 species
 Orthilia - 1 species
 Pyrola - 35 species
Monotropeae
 Allotropa - 1 species
 Hemitomes - 1 species
 Monotropa - 1 (very variable) species
 Monotropastrum - 4 species
 Monotropsis -  1 species
 Pityopus - 1 species
 Pleuricospora - 2 species
Pterosporeae
 Pterospora - 1 species
 Sarcodes -  1 species

Gentianaceae (Gentianales)

 Bartonia -  3-4 species
 Cotylanthera - 4 species
 Obolaria -  1 species
 Voyria (including Leiphaimos) - 20 species
 Voyriella - 2 species

Polygalaceae (Fabales)

 Epirhixanthes - 8 species

Liverworts

 Cryptothallus - 2 species

Taxonomic lists (genera, taxonomic)

Parasites of fungi
Symbiosis